The 1992 Miami Hurricanes baseball team represented the University of Miami in the 1992 NCAA Division I baseball season. The Hurricanes played their home games at Mark Light Field. The team was coached by Ron Fraser in his 30th season at Miami.

The Hurricanes reached the College World Series, where they finished tied for third after winning an opening round game against  and a second round game against eventual runner-up Cal State Fullerton, then losing a pair of semifinal games against Cal State Fullerton.

Personnel

Roster

Coaches

Schedule and results

References

Miami Hurricanes baseball seasons
Miami Hurricanes
College World Series seasons
Miami
Miami Hurricanes baseball